Anwar Arudin (born 9 July 1984) is a Malaysian cricketer. He played in the 2014 ICC World Cricket League Division Three tournament. In April 2018, he was named as the captain of Malaysia for the 2018 ICC World Cricket League Division Four tournament, also in Malaysia.

In August 2018, he was named in Malaysia's squad for the 2018 Asia Cup Qualifier tournament. In October 2018, he was named in Malaysia's squad in the Eastern sub-region group for the 2018–19 ICC World Twenty20 Asia Qualifier tournament.

In June 2019, he was named in Malaysia's squad for the 2019 Malaysia Tri-Nation Series tournament. He made his Twenty20 International (T20I) debut for Malayasia, against Thailand, on 24 June 2019.

References

External links
 

1984 births
Living people
Malaysian cricketers
Malaysia Twenty20 International cricketers
Place of birth missing (living people)
Cricketers at the 2010 Asian Games
Cricketers at the 2014 Asian Games
Southeast Asian Games gold medalists for Malaysia
Southeast Asian Games silver medalists for Malaysia
Southeast Asian Games medalists in cricket
Competitors at the 2017 Southeast Asian Games
Asian Games competitors for Malaysia